The 1993 Rhythmic Gymnastics European Championships is the 9th edition of the Rhythmic Gymnastics European Championships, which took place from 20 May to 23 May 1993 in Bucharest, Romania. This was the first edition of united senior and junior European Championships. From now on, in even years the seniors individual competitions and junior group competitions take place and in odd years the other way around.

Medal winners

Medal table

References 

1993 in gymnastics
Rhythmic Gymnastics European Championships